Kaasalainen is a Finnish surname. Notable people with the surname include:

Mikko Kaasalainen (1965–2020), Finnish mathematician and physicist
Nestori Kaasalainen (1915–2016), Finnish politician

See also
16007 Kaasalainen, minor planet

Finnish-language surnames